Pierre Joseph Édouard Deperthes (Édouard Deperthes) (31 July 1833–23 July 1898) was a French architect.

Early life 

Deperthes was born in Houdilcourt, a commune in the Ardennes in July 1833. He was the son of two farmers.

Education

Around the time he was 18, Deperthes travelled to Reims to study architecture, and excelled under his teacher, known only as Mssr. Brunette, at that time the chief architect in Reims.

Early career

He started his first project in 1855, at the age of 22 - working on the design of Lille Cathedral in Lille. He co-operated with two architects known only by their surnames, Leblan and Reimbeau. He then aided in the reconstruction of Saint-Ambrose church in Paris in the same year.

Death

He died in 1898 of unknown causes, aged 64, in Reims. He left two sons. He was buried in the Montparnasse Cemetery in Paris on 27 July 1898.

Work

Buildings
 Lille Cathedral (1855–1857)
 A parish church in Berne, Switzerland (1857–1864)
 Church of St. Martin in Brest (1869–1873
 A chateau in Rouen named Chateau d'Eau (1875–1880)

Projects
 Renovation of Saint-Ambrose Church, Paris
 Renovation of the Basilica of St. Anne, Sainte-Anne-d'Auray (1865–1876)
 Renovation of the Hôtel de Ville, Paris (1873–1886)

Awards
 First prize in architecture competitions in Berne, Vannes, Paris, Rouen, and Oran
 Second prize in architecture competitions in Rambouillet, Tours, Paris, Milan, and Saint-Nazaire
 Medal awarded in Salon, 1865
 Prize at the Exposition Universelle (1867), Paris
 Medal awarded at an exposition in Lyon, 1872
 Other medals from Reims, Paris, Le Havre, Lille, Grenoble, Montpellier, and Amsterdam
 He was made a knight of the Legion d'Honneur in the 1870s

References
 Notices nécrologiques AMB (fr)

1833 births
1898 deaths
19th-century French architects
People from Ardennes (department)
Burials at Montparnasse Cemetery
Architects from Reims